Sailor Chizhik is a 1955 Soviet drama film directed by .

Plot 
Having received an injury during the exercises, the sailor Chizhik is sent by the orderly to the house of Captain Luzgin. Wife of the captain of a young beautiful woman is very cruel to the orderly, constantly humiliating him, counting a servant. The only joy in the life of the sailor is communication with the little sadchuk Shura, a kind, fair and sensitive boy.

Once, unable to withstand the insults of the mistress, the orderly decides to flee. It is stopped only by an unforeseen circumstance: the heaviest inflammation of the lungs in a child. A vigilant nurse, not for a moment leaving Shura, sits Chizhik at his bed, literally fighting with death.

Starring 
 Mikhail Kuznetsov as Feodosy  Chizhik
 Vladimir Yemelyanov as Vasily Luzgin, a captain
  Nadezhda Cherednichenko as Mariya Ivanovna,  Luzgin's wife 
  Anatoly Melnikov  as Shurka,  Luzgin's son
  Nadezhda Sementsova  as Anyutka  
  Vsevolod Tyagushev   as Ivan 
 Sergey Petrov as Doktor  
 Ivan Ryzhov as sailor  
  Lev Silayev  as Michman  
 Valentina Telegina as Avdotya Petrovna  
  Mikhail Troyanovsky  as Flegont Nilych

Release 
With the Soviet Union, Vladimir Braun's film was watched by 22.3 million spectators (786th result).

References

External links 
 

1955 films
Soviet drama films
Dovzhenko Film Studios films
Films based on Russian novels
1955 drama films